Danganronpa is an adventure visual novel video game franchise created by Spike Chunsoft (previously Spike). The series follows groups of high school students who are trapped in an enclosed area, with the only way to escape being to murder a fellow student and not be caught in a subsequent investigation and trial. The music of Danganronpa comprises seven soundtrack albums, as well as numerous singles, mini albums, and other music releases. The main composer for the series is Masafumi Takada, who has composed for all of the series' soundtracks and has also released many of them on his label, Sound Prestige Records. Takada has been aided with the franchise's music by various artists, including other composers, lyricists, and singers.

The series has spanned a variety of different musical genres and styles, prominently electronic, jazz, and rock. The soundtracks have had a key focus to fit the settings, situations, and overall atmosphere of Danganronpa. This attempt at ambience has been enjoyed by music critics, who have also praised the series' many types of musical style. Several of the series' music releases have appeared on Oricon's Albums and Singles Charts, two nation-wide music charts in Japan.

Composition and themes 

While composing for the series, Masafumi Takada has aimed to make the soundtracks fit the different settings of Danganronpa, such as attempting to convey a claustrophobic atmosphere in Danganronpa: Trigger Happy Havoc, or a sense of freedom in Danganronpa 2: Goodbye Despair. According to Takada, he is helped in composing songs through specifications given to him by director Takayuki Sugawara and visual materials sent to him by series creator Kazutaka Kodaka. Takada has also said that he tries to conform the music to Danganronpa "psycho-pop" style, a term coined by Kodaka meaning gruesome horror with a pop "flair".

The series has spanned across a variety of different genres, most primarily electronic, with frequent use of synthesizers, though other genres have also been featured, such as jazz (and avant-garde jazz), rock, trip hop, and chiptune. The series take frequent use of voice samples, commonly in character and trial themes, in an attempt to create hooks and to form momentum to help build players' hype. The titular theme of the franchise, "Danganronpa" (localized in the West as "Trigger Happy Havoc"), is an electronic and jazz track that is often reused, rearranged, and sampled throughout the franchise. The theme features a short audio line saying "Danganronpa" that was added by Takada after hearing a text-to-speech voice read it out to him, which Takada stated gave him goosebumps. The franchise also features multiple series of tracks, such as the "Beautiful" tracks, which play primarily during exploration, or the frequently lyrical "Punishment" songs.

Soundtrack albums

Danganronpa: Trigger Happy Havoc Original Soundtrack 

The soundtrack of the series' first game, Danganronpa: Trigger Happy Havoc, was released by Sound Prestige Records in Japan on February 11, 2011, with a condensed version published for music streaming services, such as iTunes. The soundtrack was headed by Masafumi Takada and spans 63 tracks across 2 discs, with a total length of 2:28:03. The first disc and the beginning half of the second consists of tracks from Trigger Happy Havoc, with the remainder of disc two being made up of sound effects from the game, as well as the ending theme "Rebirth, Rebuild", performed by Megumi Ogata and composed by Satoshi Iwase.

Trigger Happy Havoc followed Masafumi Takada's work on the third-person shooter game Vanquish and was his first major solo project since leaving the game development company Grasshopper Manufacture. For Trigger Happy Havoc, Takada wanted to convey a claustrophobic and mysterious atmosphere, which he attempted through the use of combinations of varying tones and phrases, as well as sudden melodies. 

The soundtrack managed to reach No. 159 on the Oricon Albums Chart upon release and stayed on the chart for two weeks. The soundtrack was enjoyed by video game music critics; both Video Game Music Online Don Kotowski and RPGFan Patrick Gann praised the soundtrack for its stylistic diversity. Both reviewers described it as electronic and jazzy, with Kotowski also noting elements of rock, trip hop, pop, and ambient music in certain tracks. Gann complimented the soundtrack for its fitting use in-game, saying that it matches the "odd" artstyle of Danganronpa. While admitting to not being fully familiar with the game, Kotowski also praised the soundtrack's soundscape and said that it varies from track to track, describing one track as "liberating" and three others as "futuristic". Gann and Kotowski agreed that the soundtrack spans a wide array of tones: they both described "Mr. Monokuma's Lesson" as a more light track, positively contrasting to the action-oriented trial themes, which Kotowski called reminiscent to the sound of Vanquish. Ultimately, both reviewers recommended the soundtrack, with Gann calling Takada the perfect composer for Danganronpa and Kotowski saying that Trigger Happy Havoc illustrates Takada's "diversity as a composer".

Danganronpa 2: Goodbye Despair Original Soundtrack 

A soundtrack album for the series' second game, Danganronpa 2: Goodbye Despair, was announced at a press conference in July 2012. The album was released by Sound Prestige Records on August 31, 2012, in Japan. Alike the first soundtrack, a condensed version was released for streaming services. The 3:19:51-long three-disc soundtrack of 102 tracks was primarily composed by Takada. It includes both new pieces and arrangements of songs from Trigger Happy Havoc, denoted by various affixes. The third disc is comprised mostly of sound effects from the game. Some of the tracks were done in collaboration with other artists: Shingo Yasumoto and Jun Fukuda play the guitar on several tracks; the ending theme "Setting Sail, Departure" is composed by Satoshi Iwase and sung by Ogata; "Sending This to You" is performed by Ami Koshimizu as Ibuki Mioda.

With Danganronpa 2, Takada was told by series creator Kazutaka Kodaka to create a "tropical island theme" with the soundtrack, as per the game being set on a resort island. Using this as his base, Takada aimed to simulate the feel of open space, the opposite of what he set out to do with the soundtrack of Trigger Happy Havoc.

The soundtrack peaked at No. 61 on the Oricon Albums Chart and made a total of two appearances on the chart. RPGFan Patrick Gann criticized some of the soundtrack's new tracks for being "filler", but still enjoyed many others for their atmosphere. Marc Chait of Video Game Music Online also praised the tracks' ambience, but was also positive towards their engineering and mix. Gann and Chait were both keen to the rearranged tracks. Gann called Takada's task of rearranging his past work impressive and found the arrangements to typically be better than the originals, while still writing that he's "happy to listen to either version". Chait agreed on the superiority of the arrangements and also commented on the familiarity of tracks, but criticized certain remixes for being moreso identical to the Trigger Happy Havoc versions. Gann's review summarized the soundtrack as a better and expanded version of its predecessor, saying that listeners were likely better off only owning the soundtrack of Danganronpa 2. Chait concluded that the soundtrack lives up to Takada's past credits, but condemned the digital download release for discluding many tracks. In 2014, Video Game Music Online gave the soundtrack the award for "Best Score — Western Localisation" at their annual Game Music Awards.

Danganronpa: The Animation Original Soundtrack 

A two-disc album consisting of music from Danganronpa: The Animation, an anime TV-series adaptation of Trigger Happy Havoc, was released by Geneon Universal Entertainment Japan and its subsidiary, on August 28, 2013. On the Oricon Albums Chart, the soundtrack appeared exclusively during the week of September 9, 2013, at No. 199.

The soundtrack is comprised mainly of tracks from the Trigger Happy Havoc video game, as executives Seiji Kishi and Yuji Higa had wanted the show's music to preserve Danganronpa game-like atmosphere. The album also features the opening and ending themes and two character songs from the anime. The opening, "Never Say Never", is an English-language hip hop rendition of the main Danganronpa theme, written by TKDz2b and performed by American rap duo The 49ers , with backing vocals from British vocalist Natalie Oliveri. The ending theme, "Zetsubōsei: Hero Chiryōyaku", is an electronic rock theme that is written by composer and arranger Suzumu and is sung by Soraru, an artist known for his Vocaloid activities. "Zetsubōsei: Hero Chiryōyaku" was also released as a separate single. The two character songs are "Negaigoto Ensemble", sung by Makiko Ohmoto as Sayaka Maizono, and "Monokuma Ondo", sung by Nobuyo Ōyama as series antagonist Monokuma.

Danganronpa Another Episode: Ultra Despair Girls Original Soundtrack 

The music of the action-adventure spin-off game Danganronpa Another Episode: Ultra Despair Girls was released by Sound Prestige Records in Japan on December 18, 2014. With a total length of 2:47:39, the soundtrack was headed by Takada and includes three discs with 75 tracks, some arrangements of songs from Ultra Despair Girls predecessors. In terms of new tracks, in addition to some nonsense songs, the soundtrack features two lyrical pieces: the insert song "Let's Play with Monokuma", written by Kodaka and performed by the Monokuma Kids, and the game's ending theme "Progressive", composed and arranged by Tomohiro Nakatsuchi and sung by Ogata and Aya Uchida. "Progressive", which was also released as a separate single in 2015, serves as the soundtrack's effective ending, and is followed only by sound effects and an instrumental version of "Let's Play with Monokuma".

When writing the soundtrack, Takada attempted to avoid reusing melodies from Trigger Happy Havoc and Goodbye Despair, while still trying to maintain the general tone of the prior installments. In an interview with Video Game Music Online, Kodaka stated that he had requested the soundtrack to have an electro style reminiscent to the 1980s.

The soundtrack made a singular appearance on the Oricon Albums Chart, at No. 299. In a review for RPGFan, Patrick Gann expressed disappointment in the soundtrack's amount of returning themes and commented on abundant similaries between arranged tracks and their Danganronpa 2 counterparts; Gann advised listeners to only purchase the Ultra Despair Girls soundtrack if they didn't already own the soundtracks to the first two games. Gann did, however, find himself liking the "occassional" new music pieces, praising many for their style and use in-game.

Danganronpa V3: Killing Harmony Original Soundtrack White and Black 

The music of Danganronpa third mainline installment, Danganronpa V3: Killing Harmony, was released across two CD soundtrack albums, titled White and Black. The soundtrack was composed by Takada, and the two albums were jointly issued by Sound Prestige Records on February 24, 2017, with a collective length of 5:14:32–2:32:38 from White 53 tracks and 2:47:16 from Black 57 tracks. A bundle of both albums, packaged with a single-track remix CD by Takada called the Happy Holidays Mix, was sold through certain online retailers.

The soundtrack of Danganronpa V3 had a higher emphasize on jazz – something more "stylish than pop" – which Takada opined gave it a more mature and darker tone. The soundtrack was split across two albums due to having a larger track list than previous Danganronpa titles.

Both albums appeared on the Oricon Albums Chart: White peaked at No. 145 and Black peaked at No. 125. Black charted for two weeks, whereas White only charted for one. The soundtrack of V3 was nominated for best video game score in the "Rock / Electronic / Hybrid" category at Video Game Music Online 2017 Game Music Awards, but lost to Splatoon 2.

Super Danganronpa 2: The Stage 2017 Original Soundtrack 

A soundtrack album of songs from a 2017 stage play of Danganronpa 2 was published by Sound Prestige Records on April 4, 2017, in Japan, under the catalog number SPLR-1117~8. The album did not appear on any national charts.

Other albums 
From 2011 to 2012, two arrangement albums were released by Spike and Sound Prestige Records, containing tracks from the first two Danganronpa games. The first, containing remixes of tracks from Trigger Happy Havoc, as well as cutscene music, drama tracks, and cast comments, was released as part of a limited edition of the first game, and the second, containing tracks from Goodbye Despair, was released at a Comiket convention in 2014. Both albums were reviewed by RPGFan Patrick Gann, who enjoyed the first album, while finding fault with how it can be hard or expensive to obtain due to its limited release, and found the second to be a possible "treasure" for fans of Takada. A third remix album, titled Danganronpa V3 ~Happy Holidays Mix~, was released in 2017 as a purchase incentive for bundles of the Danganronpa V3 soundtrack albums. Happy Holiday Mix contains a single, 21-minute long track by Takada that was originally played at a crossover livestream of Danganronpa and Gravity Rush. A fourth remix album, containing 10 tracks from the three mainline Danganronpa installments, was released in 2021 through a collector's edition of the Danganronpa Decadence game compilation.

Several mini soundtrack albums containing select Danganronpa tracks have been released, often bundled with limited releases of the series' games. Western series publisher NIS America has released five mini albums through their online store, exclusively in North America and Europe, containing tracks from Trigger Happy Havoc, Goodbye Despair, Another Episode: Ultra Despair Girls, the compilation game Danganronpa 1-2 Reload, and Killing Harmony. The Trigger Happy Havoc album would later be temporarily rereleased alongside the Steam release of the game in 2016. A separate mini album of Killing Harmony was released with early copies of the game, and with the limited edition of the game in Japan.

In 2020, a short album of character songs composed by Takada, titled Danganronpa-ism, was released by Sound Prestige Records in conjunction with the franchise's 10th anniversary.

Songs

"Zetsubōsei: Hero Chiryōyaku" 
"Zetsubōsei: Hero Chiryōyaku" is the ending theme to Danganronpa: The Animation. An electronic rock pop song, it is written by Suzumu and performed by Soraru. It was released both as a single and as track on the second disc of Danganronpa: The Animation soundtrack album. The single was released by Geneon Universal Entertainment Japan and Rondo Robe on September 4, 2013. It came in both a regular and a limited edition; the limited edition included a bonus track and a DVD. The anime's soundtrack was released a month before the single.

With the B-sides "Haiiro Shōnen Rock" and "Zoku Hetakuso Utopia Seikin", the single release peaked at No. 17 on the Oricon Singles Chart and charted for seven weeks. Phile Web reported that the single had sold 5,920 copies by September 8, 2013.

"World's End Curtain Call -Theme of Danganronpa the Stage-" 
"World's End Curtain Call -Theme of Danganronpa the Stage-" is the theme song to Danganronpa: Kibō no Gakuen to Zetsubō no Kōkōsei The Stage, a 2014 stage play adaptation of Trigger Happy Havoc. It is by Trustrick, a musical duo consisting of guitarist Billy and vocalist Sayaka Kanda. "World's End Curtain Call" was released as a single by Nippon Columbia on November 12, 2014, though in a limited quantity of 3,868 copies. The song charted for a single week on the Oricon Singles Chart, making 27th place.

"Progressive" 
"Progressive", the ending theme to Ultra Despair Girls, is performed by Megumi Ogata and Aya Uchida as the characters Makoto and Komaru Naegi, respectively. It was composed and arranged by Tomohiro Nakatsuchi. The song was first released on the Ultra Despair Girls soundtrack album on December 18, 2014, on which it appeared on the third disc and acted as the album's effective final track. It was then released as a CD single on January 28, 2015, under the Lantis label. A reconstructed, high-resolution edition of the single, produced by Junnosuke Sato, was released on April 12, 2017.

"Progressive" charted once on the Oricon Singles Chart, at No. 62. A LisAni! review describes "Progressive" as a song that illustrates the singing characters' determination and courage to press on despite tough conditions. The review attributes the emotion to the song's intense rock and Ogata and Uchida's vocals, and also lauds the high-resolution release for achieving a more energetic sound that amplifies the lyrics' vividness. Reviewing the Ultra Despair Girls soundtrack, Patrick Gann called "Progressive" his favorite Danganronpa game ending theme, and said that it made the soundtrack end on a high note.

The B-side on the "Progressive" single is "Poison -Gekiyaku-". It is performed by Ogata as the character Nagito Komaeda. Alike "Progressive", "Poison (Gekiyaku)" was praised in a LisAni! review, which referred to Ogata's vocals as the highlight of the track, with the lyrics walking on a line of good and bad luck, something indicative of Nagito's character.

Danganronpa 3: The End of Hope's Peak High School themes 
The Danganronpa 3: The End of Hope's Peak High School anime series features original opening and ending themes. "Kamiiro Awase" is the opening theme to the show's Despair Arc, accompanied by "Zettai Kibō Birthday" as the corresponding ending theme. The Future Arc features "Dead or Lie" as its opening, whilst "Recall the End" is the ending. "Ever Free" by Hide with Spread Beaver is used as a ending theme exclusively in the final episodes, being chosen to conclude the show since Kodaka had been listening to the song during the beginning of production.

The Despair Arc ending theme, "Zettai Kibō Birthday", is performed by Ogata as Nagito Komaeda. It was released as a single by NBCUniversal Entertainment Japan on August 3, 2016. The complementing opening theme, "Kamiiro Awase", is performed by the four-member music unit Binaria, made up of writer Annabel, composer Nagi Yanagi, arranger Yoshihisa Nagao, and visual artist Xai. "Kamiiro Awase" was released as a single by NBCUniversal Japan on the same day as "Zettai Kibō Birthday", and was available in both a regular and limited edition. "Zettai Kibō Birthday" featured on the Oricon charts for three weeks, peaking at 37th place, whilst "Kamiiro Awase" charted for four weeks and peaked at No. 38.

The opening theme to the Future Arc, "Dead or Lie", is performed by Maon Kurosaki and Trustrick. It is composed and arranged by Keisuke Kurose of the band Uroboros, with its lyrics having been written by Kurosaki. The Future Arc ending theme, "Recall the End", is performed by Trustrick alone, and is produced and arranged by Narasaki of Coaltar of the Deepers. "Recall the End" was released on August 10, 2016, by Nippon Columbia as part of an extended play. "Dead or Lie" was released as a single seven days later, on NBCUniversal Entertainment Japan. "Dead or Lie" stayed on the Oricon Singles Chart for five weeks, peaking at No. 27, whilst "Recall the End" charted for three weeks on the albums chart, peaking at No. 17.

Music videos for "Kamiiro Awase" and "Dead or Lie" were released by NBCUniversal Japan, after they had showcased them in 45 to 50 second previews on YouTube.

"Samurai Tunes" 
"Samurai Tunes" is an electronic dance rap song by the boy band of the same name, that serves as the ending theme to Danganronpa 3 The Stage 2018 ~The End of Kibōgamine Gakuen~, a stage adaptation of Danganronpa 3: The End of Hope's Peak High School. The song was featured on Samurai Tunes' eponymous debut single, released by Nippon Columbia on July 18, 2018. The single charted on the Oricon charts for two weeks, peaking at No. 33.

Reception and legacy 
Danganronpa music has been described as essential to the series' personality by both reviewers and staff: Destructoid Eric van Allen called the series' music a vocal part of its tone, and Kodaka hailed the music as "super important" in an interview with Video Games Music Online. The soundtracks have been nominated twice in the Game Music Awards, an annual ceremony hosted by Video Game Music Online, and the series' titular main theme was listed by Screen Rant as one of the ten best theme songs in video games.

Danganronpa music has been performed live on different occasions. At the 2017 iteration of the gaming festival Tokaigi, eight tracks from Danganronpa V3 were performed by a Takada-led band. In November 2021, two performances of popular songs from the series were held in Saitama Prefecture, in conjunction with Danganronpa 10th anniversary.

Remixed Danganronpa tracks are included in the rhythm game Crypt of the NecroDancer, along with a skin of Danganronpa mascot and antagonist Monokuma, as part of a collaboration between the two IPs. Two lyrical songs from the series have appeared in greatest hits albums of their artists: 
"Zetsubōsei: Hero Chiryōyaku" in Suzumu's Zoku Kebyoningen (2015) and "Dead or Lie" in Maon Kurosaki's M.A.O.N (2017).

References

External links 
  on Oricon 
  on Oricon 

Danganronpa
Video game music discographies
Video game soundtracks